William L. Wall (1931/32 – August 4, 2014) was president (1972) of the National Association of Basketball Coaches (NABC) and also served as the executive director of the organization from 1973 to 1975 while he was still at MacMurray College. 

He died at his home in Bermuda Dunes, California. Wall was inducted into the Women's Basketball Hall of Fame in 2004.

References

 Founding father of MacMurray Athletics passes away, MacMurray College press release, 7 August 2014

1930s births
Year of birth uncertain
2014 deaths
Basketball executives
High school basketball coaches in the United States
High school football coaches in Ohio
MacMurray College faculty
MacMurray Highlanders athletic directors
MacMurray Highlanders baseball coaches
MacMurray Highlanders men's basketball coaches
National Association of Basketball Coaches
National Collegiate Basketball Hall of Fame inductees
People from Bermuda Dunes, California
Ripon Red Hawks baseball coaches
Ripon Red Hawks football coaches
Ripon Red Hawks men's basketball coaches